The Compagnie Tunisienne de Navigation (CTN or COTUNAV) is a Tunisian shipping line, providing regular passenger ferry connections between Tunisia and the ports of Marseille and Genoa, as well as freight transport to Barcelona and Livorno.

Founded on 7 March 1959, it initially concentrated on the development of regular shipping links between Tunisia and its principal trading partners, essentially serving only Marseille and Rouen. However, with the drive to diversify Tunisian overseas trade, it rapidly expanded its route network to encompass ports in Italy, Spain, Germany and the Benelux countries.

In the 1970s CTN expanded its presence in the transport of crude oil, petroleum products and foodstuffs. With the commissioning in 1978 of the ferry Habib, providing service between Tunis, Marseille and Genoa, it also increased its involvement in passenger transport. CTN expanded its fleet by buying the bulk carriers Moularès and S’hib in 1976–77 and El-Kef in 1982.

Moving to roll-on/roll-off service, CTN turned to the renewal of its fleet, taking delivery of El-Jem and Tozeur in 1977, and of Bizerte and Kairouan in 1979. For the summers of 1990, 1991 and 1992 CTN also chartered the turbo-electric ship Carlo R from the Sicilian company Alimar.

Forced to re-evaluate its activities in the light of recent changes in the maritime world, CTN has gradually sold its older ships in order to refocus attention on its core businesses. It is gradually renewing its fleet with the commissioning of two large ro-ro ships of 18,000 tons: Ulysse and Salammbô 7. In June 1999, the line’s new Norwegian-built ferry Carthage came into service.

In 2012, CTN received the new ferry Tanit built by DSME. As a consequence of this addition, the Habib and El-Kef were decommissioned in 2013.

Fleet
CTN operate a fleet of seven vessels consisting of five RORO and two ROPAX ferries.

Current fleet

References

Notes

Bibliography
Homepage of CTN
This article is a translation from the equivalent article on the French Wikipedia

External links
Shipping Companies in Tunisia

Ferry companies of Tunisia
Government-owned companies of Tunisia
Economy of Tunis
Transport companies established in 1959
1959 establishments in Tunisia